Microsoft Golf is a video game spin-off of the Links series.

Gameplay
Microsoft Golf: The True Challenge of Golf for Windows adapts the Links game engine for Windows, and a Multimedia Edition was also published.

Reception
Patrick Marshall for InfoWorld said "The scenery is great, the animation of the players is fantastic, and if you've got sound equipment, you can even hear the birds chirping."

Scott A. May for Compute! reviewed Microsoft Golf for Windows Multimedia Edition and said "the multimedia edition adds many enjoyable extraneous effects but few indispensable enhancements. Newcomers to Links and Multimedia PC games in general, however, will find this product absolutely dazzling."

Mike Kogan for Electronic Entertainment said "this game breaks new ground in its integration of videos into the game play and will be an asset to any sports-loving MPC owner."

Reviews
PC Player (German magazine)
CD Player (German)
PC Player (German magazine)

References

External links
Article in PC Games
Article in Computer Games Strategy Plus
Article in Byte
Article in Game Players PC Entertainment
Article in Compute!
Article in PC Zone

1992 video games
Golf video games
Microsoft games
Video games developed in the United States
Video games set in the United States
Windows games
Windows-only games